The Tamboti River is a river in the Limpopo Province of South Africa. It is a right hand tributary of the long Limpopo River.

See also
 List of rivers in South Africa

References 

Rivers of Limpopo